Zapolyarny District (Nenets: Поляртяхӑна район) is an administrative and municipal district (raion), the only one in Nenets Autonomous Okrug, Russia. It encompasses all of the territory of the autonomous okrug, with the exception of the territory of the town of okrug significance of Naryan-Mar, the only other top-level administrative division of the autonomous okrug. Its administrative center is the urban locality (a work settlement) of Iskateley. Population: 20,432 (2010 Census). The population of Iskateley accounts for 33.7% of the district's total population.

Etymology
The name of the district is an adjective which literally means "beyond the Arctic Circle", due to the fact that most of the district's territory indeed lies to the north of the Arctic Circle.

History
Prior to 2010, the territory of the autonomous okrug had only one top-level administrative division—the town of okrug significance of Naryan-Mar—with the rest of the territory divided into selsoviets which were not a part of any top-level division. In 2006, within the framework of municipal divisions, the town of okrug significance of Naryan-Mar was incorporated as Naryan-Mar Urban Okrug, and the rest of the autonomous okrug's territory was incorporated as Zapolyarny Municipal District. However, it was not until April 19, 2010 when an administrative district matching the territory of the municipal district was established, and it was not until April 28, 2014 when "Zapolyarny" officially became the district's name.

Geography

Economy

The outer boundary of Zapolyarny District is identical to that of Nenets Autonomous Okrug; therefore there is no economic sector of significance to the district that is not also of equal significance to the autonomous okrug. The main economic drivers are oil and gas, although reindeer husbandry is still seen as a core part of the culture of the indigenous Nenets people.

References

Notes

Sources

Nenets Autonomous Okrug